is a city located in central Kanagawa Prefecture, Japan. , the city had an estimated population of 242,065 and a population density of 8900 persons per km².

Geography
Yamato is located approximately 40 to 50 kilometers from central Tokyo and 20 kilometers from central Yokohama. It measures 3.22 kilometers from east-to-west by 9.79 kilometers north-to-south, and is thus long and narrow orientated from north-to-south.  It is located on the Sagamino Plateau (Sagamino Plateau) and has a gently sloping terrain from north to south. The height difference is 38 meters, but there are almost no hills. The highest point in the city is 90 meters above sea level at the site of the Shimotsuruma Asama Shrine, and the lowest point is 30 meters above sea level.

Surrounding municipalities
Kanagawa Prefecture
Zama
Fujisawa
Ebina
Sagamihara
Ayase
Yokohama
Tokyo
Machida, Tokyo

Climate
Yamato has a Humid subtropical climate (Köppen Cfa) characterized by warm summers and cool winters with light to no snowfall.  The average annual temperature in Yamato is 14.9 °C. The average annual rainfall is 1632 mm with September as the wettest month. The temperatures are highest on average in August, at around 25.7 °C, and lowest in January, at around 4.3 °C.

Demographics
Per Japanese census data, the population of Yamato has grown steadily over the past 70 years.

History
The area around present-day Yamato city has been inhabited for thousands of years. Archaeologists have found stone tools from the Japanese Paleolithic period and ceramic shards from the Jōmon period at numerous locations in the area. It is mentioned in the Engishiki records from the Heian period. By the Kamakura period, this area became part of the Shibuya shōen. It came under control of the Ashikaga clan in the early Muromachi period and was later part of the territories of the Later Hōjō clan from Odawara. With the start of the Edo period, the area was part of the tenryō territory in Sagami Province controlled directly by the Tokugawa shogunate, but administered through various hatamoto. Under the rule of the 5th shōgun, Tokugawa Tsunayoshi, one of these hatamoto, Sakamoto Shigeharu (1630–1693) by virtue of his position as Ōmetsuke and Jisha-bugyō, exceeded 10,000 koku in income, and thus became daimyō of the newly proclaimed Fukami Domain in October 1682. However, his revenues decreased below 10,000 koku in May 1687 and the domain was suppressed.

During the cadastral reforms after the Meiji Restoration, the area of present-day Yamato became part of Kōza District, Kanagawa Prefecture. On April 1, 1889, it was administratively divided into Shibuya Village and Tsurumi Village, which later changed its name on September 25, 1891 to Yamato Village. The area was connected by rail in 1926 via the Sagami Railway and in 1929 by the Odakyu Electric Railway, leading to an increase in population. The Imperial Japanese Navy Sagamino Air Base was established in 1940. Yamato Village became Yamato Town in 1943, and Shibuya Village became Shibuya Town in 1944. However, Shibuya was dissolved in 1955, with a portion merging with nearby Fujisawa, and the remaining portion reverting to village status. That portion was merged with Yamato in 1957, which became Yamato City in 1959. In April 2000, Yamato exceeded 200,000 in population, and was proclaimed a special city with increased local autonomy.

In 2020, the city gained international attention for outlawing walking in designated areas while using a smartphone, it was the first of its kind to do so without implementing a fine or monetary penalty.

Government
Yamato has a mayor-council form of government with a directly elected mayor and a unicameral city council of 28 members. Yamato contributes four members to the Kanagawa Prefectural Assembly. In terms of national politics, the city is part of Kanagawa 13th district of the lower house of the Diet of Japan.

Education
Yamato has 19 public elementary schools and nine public middle schools operated by the city government. The city has four public high schools operated by the Kanagawa Prefectural Board of Education, and the prefecture also operates two special education schools for the handicapped. The city also has one private elementary school, one private middle school and one private high school. A private junior college, the St. Cecilia Women's Junior College is located within Yamato.

Transportation

Railway
 Tokyu Corporation Tōkyū Den-en-toshi Line 
  - 
 Odakyu Electric Railway – Odakyū Enoshima Line 
 -  -  -  -  - 
 Sagami Railway - Sotetsu Main Line
 -

Highway

Sister cities
Yamato is twinned with:
  Minami-Uonuma, Niigata, Japan
  Taiwa, Miyagi, Japan 
  Kōshū, Yamanashi, Japan

Noted people from Yamato
Jungo Fujimoto, professional football player
Mitsuko Horie, singer, voice actress
Ryuichi Kawamura, singer-songwriter
Takeo Kawamura, professional baseball player
Eiko Kawashima, singer-songwriter
Nahomi Kawasumi, professional football player
Masahiko Kondō, singer
Hiroshi Nagano, singer, actor
Noriko Narazaki, judoka
Shinobu Ohno, professional football player

References

External links 

Official Website 

 
Cities in Kanagawa Prefecture